Aiken Technical College is a public community college in Graniteville, South Carolina. It is part of the South Carolina Technical College System.  More than 3,400 students enroll in credit courses annually and 10,000 people enroll in non-credit courses and programs.

External links
Official website

Education in Aiken County, South Carolina
Universities and colleges accredited by the Southern Association of Colleges and Schools
Educational institutions established in 1972
Buildings and structures in Aiken County, South Carolina
South Carolina Technical College System
1972 establishments in South Carolina
NJCAA athletics